Leo Ehlen (20 May 1953 – 10 February 2016) was a Dutch football player.

Club career
A tough-tackling defender or defensive midfielder, Ehlen started his professional career with Fortuna SC and joined Roda JC in 1975, where he played alongside Dick Nanninga, Pierre Vermeulen and Theo de Jong.  Nicknamed the Neeskens of Roda after Holland hard man Johan Neeskens, Ehlen scored 6 goals in 233 official matches for the club and left them after nine years for a spell with Belgian side Waterschei.

He later played for amateur team EHC.

Personal life and death
After retiring, Ehlen owned a bar in Broeksittard.

He died in February 2016, aged 62. He had suffered from a kidney disease. He was survived by his wife and son. A minute silence was observed in his memory before kick-off of Roda's home game against FC Twente three days later.

References

External links
 Roda JC career stats - Roda JC Spelers
 Career stats - Elf Voetbal

1953 births
2016 deaths
People from Sittard
Association football defenders
Dutch footballers
Fortuna Sittard players
Roda JC Kerkrade players
K. Waterschei S.V. Thor Genk players
Eredivisie players
Belgian Pro League players
Dutch expatriate footballers
Expatriate footballers in Belgium
Dutch expatriate sportspeople in Belgium
EHC Hoensbroek players
Footballers from Limburg (Netherlands)